Shidaidaka (次第高) are a yōkai of the Chūgoku region.

Summary
They are told about in the Tottori Prefecture, in Niyomiya, Atoichi, and Tsunozu of Gōtsu, Shimane Prefecture, Iwakuni, Asa District, and Abu District of Yamaguchi Prefecture, the Hiroshima Prefecture, the Okayama Prefecture, etc.

It is a humanoid yōkai that appears above roads, and when those that see it look up, the shidaidaka would accordingly grow taller. In reverse, if one looks down it becomes shorter, but if one doesn't look down, it would steadily grow taller.

Therefore, if one ever meets a Shidaidaka, then one must never look up. In reverse, if one looks further and further downwards, the shidaidaka would steadily become smaller, and then disappear. In Sakurae, Ōchi District, Shimane Prefecture (now Gōtsu), in a place called Kawato, when a shidaidaka appears, one must never look at it from beneath one's thighs.

According to a folktale in Hazumi, Ōchi, Shimane Prefecture, it is said that when one goes out on a hunt, whatever spoils one gets, it is best to leave at least one last bullet to prepare for when a shidaidaka would appear in order to kill it. In Matsukawa, Gōtsu, Shidaidaka are also said to be the boss of nekomata, and when a certain hunter went to bring down a shidaidaka, its true form was, as thought, a nekomata.

When a person walks on a path towards , the path steadily becomes more inclined, and when someone becomes surprised and looks upward, the entire hill becomes larger, and thus traps that person, but there is a theory that this legend comes from the shidaidaka, with changes in its name and content.

Notes

See also
 List of legendary creatures from Japan

Yōkai
Japanese folklore